Monster Family (also known as Happy Family) is a 2017 computer-animated monster comedy film directed and produced by Holger Tappe, and co-written by David Safier. It is based on David Safier's 2011 novel Happy Family. The film stars Emily Watson, Nick Frost, Jessica Brown Findlay, Celia Imrie, Catherine Tate, and Jason Isaacs.

The film was both a critical and financial failure: it was unanimously panned by critics, who criticized its voice acting, animation, writing and humor. It was also a box office bomb, only grossing $26.4 million against a $30 million budget.

A sequel, Monster Family 2, was released in 2021.

Plot
In Transylvania, Count Dracula laments about his loneliness with his three bat servants. He receives a phone call from Emma Wishbone, who has mistakenly called him instead of a monster costume store. She talks to him briefly before accidentally dropping her cell phone down a storm drain. Emma is depressed as family tensions build up - her own bookstore is in dire financial straits, her son Max is a victim of bullying due to his awkward and stereotypical mannerisms, her daughter Fay is a narcissistic teenager, and her husband Frank is overworked and sleep-deprived, neglecting her. Dracula decides to make Emma his new bride, and persuades Baba Yaga to curse her and turn her into a real vampire so she will stay with him.

Her new-age friend Cheyenne gives Emma some tickets to a costume party, and Emma makes costumes for Emma's family: She as a vampire, Frank as Frankenstein's monster, Fay as a mummy, and Max as a werewolf. Due to a mix-up at the party, they are thrown out by security, causing Emma to have a breakdown. Baba Yaga takes advantage of the situation and curses her, but as her entire family were unhappy, they are all cursed and transform into the monsters they dressed up as.

Emma chases Baba Yaga who escapes, but not before they learn that her amulet needs to be recharged at the London Eye which happens to have been built on a site of ancient power. Meanwhile, Max scares his bully, enjoying his transformation and Fay is rejected by her school crush. Frank has lost his intelligence, but still shows love for Emma.

At the airport Fay hypnotizes a check-in clerk to allow them to fly, but during the flight Emma is overwhelmed by vampiric bloodlust, and only a timely intervention from Dracula halts this and he absconds with the confused and blood-hungry Emma aboard his personal jet leaving her family on the passenger plane.

Dracula tries to persuade Emma to stay with him, and although tempted she decides to be loyal to her family - causing Dracula to eject her from his plane where she lands next to the London Eye just as her family arrive. Meanwhile Dracula decides that if he cannot have Emma, nobody can, and instructs his hunchback servant Renfield to prepare a snowflake machine to destroy the world in retaliation.

Baba Yaga charges her amulet but is accosted by the Wishbones, however she sends them to Egypt. Cheyenne tries to help, but after rescuing Baba Yaga from falling to her death the two become friends. Baba Yaga explains that Dracula intended for her to curse only Emma, but the entire family's  unhappiness caused them all to change - only the entire family being happy will break the curse.

In Egypt, the family has another argument culminating in them all walking off in different directions: Fay meets Imhotep who believes her to be beautiful, and wants to take over the world with her help. Max finds a hotel where all the guests are scared of him, and Frank rescues a group of supermodels who take him back to their hotel - the same one Max is at.

Emma is once again consumed by bloodlust, and once again rescued by Dracula. Despite being tempted by him again she still misses her family, who appears in the castle after a repentant Baba Yaga transports them there. Renfield explains Dracula's plan to shoot a giant snowball into the Sun, killing all life apart from vampires who do not need the sun to survive. While Dracula is in his Lazarus pool which ensures his youth, the family plans to add holy water to it, killing him, but he overpowers them. Realizing they need to work together and are happy to be together the curse is broken and they all turn back to human form. With the help of Renfield and the servant bats they trap Dracula between beams of sunlight and freeze him with his snowflake weapon.

The Wishbones return home, and their circumstances change. Frank stands up for himself at work after putting a photo of their family adventure and the frozen Dracula on his desk, Max's bully has realised the error of his ways and befriends him, and Fay meets a nerd in a knight's costume at a costume party that Emma throws at home. Baba Yaga, Renfield, and the three bats crash the party. The family takes another photo together, showing their happiness.

Cast
 Emily Watson as Emma Wishbone, the matriarch of the Wishbone family. She is turned into a vampire.
 Nick Frost as Frank Wishbone, the patriarch of the Wishbone family who is Emma's husband and the father of Fay and Max. He is turned into a monster similar to Frankenstein's monster.
 Jessica Brown Findlay as Fay Wishbone, the daughter of Emma and Frank who is turned into a mummy.
 Ethan Rouse as Max Wishbone, the son of Emma and Frank who is turned into a werewolf.
 Celia Imrie as Cheyenne, Emma's co-worker at her bookstore and family friend.
 Catherine Tate as Baba Yaga, Dracula's former captive witch. She is responsible for turning the Wishbone family into monsters.
 Jason Isaacs as Count Dracula, a vampire who becomes infatuated with Emma.
 Ewan Bailey as Renfield, Baba Yaga's husband and Dracula's former butler.
 Issac Rouse as Jayden, Fay's boyfriend.
 Daniel Ben-Zenou as Imhotep, a mummy who teaches Fay how to use her mummy abilities.
 Jessica McDonald as Sheila, Fay's schoolfriend.
 Sidney Dorn as Bull, the school bully who picks on Max.
 Emma Tate as Head Model
 Dirk Stollberg, Jan Makino, and Rainer Fritzsche as Dracula's bats

Reception
On Rotten Tomatoes, the film has an approval rating of 10% based on 21 reviews, and an average rating of 3.40/10. The critical consensus reads: "Monster Family promises a family-friendly animated monster mash, but succeeds only in delivering a viewing experience so lackluster that parents may find it genuinely frightening."

Box office
The film was a box office bomb. It grossed $127,259 in the US, £443,269 in the UK, $4,692,430 in Germany and $21,178,934 in other countries for a worldwide total of $26,441,982, making it a commercial failure.

Release
The film was theatrically released in the United Kingdom on 2 March 2018 and was released on Sky Cinema on the same day. Monster Family was released on DVD in the UK on 2 October 2018 by Universal Pictures Home Entertainment.

References

External links
 Monster Family at British Film Institute website
 Monster Family at Internet Movie Database

2017 animated films
2017 films
2017 computer-animated films
2017 comedy horror films
2010s fantasy comedy films
Dracula films
English-language German films
Vampire comedy films
Vampires in animated film
Animated films about families
Films about dysfunctional families
Films set in Egypt
Animated films set in London
Animated films set in New York City
Films set in Transylvania
British werewolf films
Werewolves in animated film
Frankenstein films
Mummy films
British vampire films
German vampire films
Films about witchcraft
2010s monster movies
Halloween horror films
2017 comedy films
Fiction about the Sun
Films set in castles
Films set in deserts
Sun in film
Baba Yaga
Animated films based on Slavic mythology
2010s English-language films
British films set in New York City
2010s British films
2010s German films